Manmohan was an Indian actor of Bollywood, well known for his role as a villain. He also worked in Bengali, Gujarati and Punjabi films.
He also acted in Movie Raja Rani, released in year 1973.
He was a regular in Rajesh Khanna's movies.

Early life 
He was born and brought up in Jamshedpur. Manmohan came from a well-to-do family, who had their own business. Totally different from his other three brothers, he was very keen on becoming an actor from childhood. His son Nitin Manmohan is a producer, who produced films like Bol Radha Bol (1992), Laadla (1994), Deewangee (2001) and Bhoot (2003) etc.

Film career 
He came to Bombay in 1950 and got acquainted with then personalities like Shankar-Jaikishen, Bhappi Sonie and G. P. Sippy. His close association with Jaikishen got him known to Keval Kayshap who cast him in his first film Shaheed. He was also in all of Bhappi Sonie's films. Through Bhappi Sonie, he met Shakti Samanta, Pramod Chakravarty and Manoj Kumar. Then he got N. N. Sippy's film Gumnaam. He was at the top of his acting career in the '70s.

Filmography

References

External links 
 

Indian male film actors
Male actors in Hindi cinema
20th-century Indian male actors
1979 deaths
1933 births